Colierul de turcoaze is a 1986 Romanian action film directed by Gheorghe Vitanidis.

Cast 
 Marga Barbu - Agatha Slatineanu
 Florin Piersic - Margelatu
 Szabolcs Cseh - Buza de iepure 
 Alexandru Repan - Serge Troianoff
 Ion Besoiu - domnitorul 
 George Motoi - lt. Deivos  
 Jean Constantin - „profesorul” Aurică 
 Constantin Codrescu - C.A. Rosetti
  - 
  - 
 George Motoi - 
  - 
  - 
 George Pitis - 
 Rodica Popescu Bitănescu -

References

External links 

1986 action films
1986 films
Romanian action films
Films directed by Gheorghe Vitanidis
1980s Romanian-language films